Ali Jaleel (1979-2009) was a citizen of the Maldive Islands who is reported to have died as a suicide bomber. He is reported to have attacked the Inter-Service Intelligence Directorate headquarters in Lahore, Pakistan on 27 May 2009.

Pakistani accounts from the time of the attack say the three attackers who were killed, were unidentified. Subsequently, a martyr video, and an interview established Ali Jaleel was one of the bombers.

Ali Jaleel, and two other Maldive citizens were captured in 2006, on suspicion they were attempting to travel to Pakistan for underground military training. He was convicted of preaching without a license in December 2006. He was sentenced to two years house arrest on December 26, 2006.
According to Haveeru Online, he violated his house arrest and was sentenced to four months of banishment on February 8, 2008.

References

1979 births
2009 deaths
Pakistani Islamists
Suicide bombers
Suicides in Pakistan
People from Malé
Maldivian al-Qaeda members
Maldivian expatriates in Pakistan
2009 suicides